Aleksandar Mitrović (Serbian Cyrillic: Александар Митровић) 4 August 1933 – 19 September 2012 was a Serbian politician who was Deputy Prime Minister and then Acting Prime Minister of Yugoslavia.

References

1933 births
2012 deaths
Government ministers of Yugoslavia